Leurbost is a village on the east coast of the Isle of Lewis in the Outer Hebrides of Scotland. It is the main settlement in the area of the island known as North Lochs. Leurbost is within the parish of Lochs.

Population:
Over 500

Languages :
English (UK) 
Gàidhlig (Gaelic)

Football Team:
Lochs FC

Football Pitch/Best pies served at:
Creagan Dubh

Pies served by:
Pie Ladies

History
In 1856 reports circulated of a 'sea-serpent' in a fresh water loch near the town.

Economy
Amenities in the village include a community centre; a school, Sgoil nan Loch, (which replaced the old Leurbost as well as Fidigarry (Ranish), Knockiandue (Keose) and Balallan schools); a petrol station and a shop. The school caters for children from nursery age through primary 1–7.

References

External links

Hebridean Connections – Leurbost
Canmore – Lewis, Leurbost, Parish Church site record
Canmore – Lewis, Leurbost, Manse site record
Canmore – Lewis, Leurbost site record

Villages in the Isle of Lewis